École Supérieure des Affaires may refer to:

 École supérieure des affaires (Beirut)
 École Supérieure des Affaires (Lille)